Gérard Carlier (1905–1975) was a German-born French screenwriter. He worked on several scripts for films starring the comedian Fernandel in the postwar era.

Selected filmography
 Three from St Cyr (1939)
 The Blue Danube (1940)
 Dorothy Looks for Love (1945)
 Dropped from Heaven (1946)
Judicial Error (1948)
 Brilliant Waltz (1949)
 The Heroic Monsieur Boniface (1949)
 Emile the African (1949)
 Fandango (1949)
 Casimir (1950)
 Rendezvous in Grenada (1951)
 The Sleepwalker (1951)
 My Wife, My Cow and Me (1952)
 The Last Robin Hood (1953)
 April Fools' Day (1954)
 Good King Dagobert (1963)
 Mathias Sandorf (1963)
 Four Queens for an Ace (1966)

References

Bibliography
 Kris Van Heuckelom. Polish Migrants in European Film 1918–2017. Springer, 2019.

External links

1905 births
1975 deaths
German emigrants to France
20th-century French screenwriters
Mass media people from Königsberg